Black Hand Sandstone is a multistory, crossbedded, coarse-grained conglomeratic sandstone within the Cuyahoga Formation in Ohio.

Further reading
 
 
 
 

Sandstone in the United States